The "GDD CUP" International Challenger Guangzhou (formerly known as ATP Challenger Guangzhou and China International Guangzhou) has been a tennis tournament held in Guangzhou, China. The event was held in 2008 as part of the ATP Challenger Series and in 2011 ATP Challenger Tour. It was played on hard courts.

The record holder is Alexander Kudryavtsev with two double title.

Past finals

Singles

Doubles

References

External links

ATP Challenger Tour
Tennis tournaments in China
Hard court tennis tournaments